HMS Royal Albert was a 121 gun three-decker ship of the Royal Navy launched in 1854 at Woolwich Dockyard. She had originally been designed as a sailing ship but was converted to screw propulsion while still under construction.

Lithographs of the launch at Woolwich, 13 May 1854 of HMS Royal Albert screw steamer, claim she has 131 guns.

From commissioning at Sheerness she was first commanded by Commander Alexander Little between June and October 1854. From October to November 1854 by Captain Thomas Sabine Pasley while still at Sheerness.  From 14 February 1855 to April 1857 she was commanded by Captain William Robert Mends as flagship to Rear-Admiral Edmund Lyons commanding the Mediterranean fleet, then chiefly concerned with the Crimean War. In late December 1855, she sprang a leak whilst on a voyage from the Crimea to Malta and was beached at San Nicholas, Kea, Greece. She was subsequently refloated and taken in to Malta for repairs. From April 1857 to 20 August 1858 she was commanded by Captain Francis Egerton.

From 25 August 1858 to October 1859 she was commanded by Captain Edward Bridges Rice as part of the Channel Squadron under Rear-Admiral Charles Fremantle. She received a new captain on 1 October 1859, Captain Henry James Lacon, who remained up to her paying off at Plymouth on 25 January 1861. Rear-Admiral Robert Fanshawe took over the Channel Squadron from 10 October 1860. In 1884 she was sold for breaking up at Charlton.

References

External links

 Ship information online

 

Ships of the line of the Royal Navy
Ships built in Woolwich
1854 ships
Maritime incidents in December 1855